Andrea Schera (born 1 September 1997) is an Italian sprint canoeist who won medals at senior level between World Championships and European Championships.

References

External links
 
 Andrea Schera at the G.S. Fiamme Gialle

1997 births
Living people
Italian male canoeists
Sportspeople from Palermo
Canoeists of Fiamme Gialle
21st-century Italian people